Helena Carr (born Anne Helena John; September 1946) is a Malaysian-born Australian businesswoman and the wife of former Premier of New South Wales, and former Senator and former Foreign Minister, Bob Carr.

Early life
She was born Anne Helena John in Perak, Malaysia, the youngest of six children of an Indian father and a Chinese mother. In 1965, she came to Sydney to study at Our Lady of Mercy College, Parramatta. As economics was one of her strongest subjects, she majored in economics at the University of Sydney where she was a resident at Sancta Sophia College. 

Carr joined Leigh Mardon, a subsidiary of Coca-Cola Amatil, in 1976, first as market research officer and then as product manager. She left in 1981 to join Amatil before returning to Leigh Mardon as business development manager and then division manager, where she was responsible for a staff of 1,000.

Marriage and politics
In 1972, she met Bob Carr on a vacation in Tahiti and the two were married on 24 February 1973.

Bob Carr became Federal President of Young Labor shortly after. Helena Carr started a successful business career and by the 1980s, she was the managing director of Leigh Mardon.  In 1992, her bid to buy Offset Alpine for a sum approaching A$15 million was unsuccessful, losing out to a syndicate headed by Rene Rivkin.

She and Max Turner later bought Merritt Madden Printing and Advanced Graphics, a commercial printer producing prospectuses, annual reports, and trade magazines. In October 2004, she and Turner sold the business to the New Zealand company Blue Star Print Group.

References

Further reading
 Helena Dodkin Bob Carr: the Reluctant Leader, University of New South Wales Press 2003 
 Andrew West and Rachel Morris, Bob Carr: a Self-Made Man HarperCollins Pymble NSW 2003 
 Crown Content Who's Who in Australia 2005, North Melbourne page 379

1946 births
Living people
Malaysian people of Indian descent
Malaysian people of Chinese descent
University of Sydney alumni
Australian people of Chinese descent
Australian people of Indian descent
Spouses of Australian politicians
Australian women in business